Hmayak is an Armenian given name. Notable people with the name include:

 Hmayak Siras, Armenian writer, editor and translator
 Hmayak Babayan, Armenian Red Army major general
 Hmayak Sahaki Grigoryan, Armenian poet and translator

Armenian masculine given names